INS Nilgiri (F33) was the lead ship of her class of frigates. Commissioned on 3 June 1972 into the Indian Navy, she was decommissioned in 1996.

INS Nilgiri was the first major warship built in India keel up, with a displacement ~20x that of an Ajay class patrol vessel. INS Nilgiri was built at Mazagon Docks Limited, Mumbai in collaboration with Yarrow Shipbuilders, Glasgow. The collaboration involved designs of the Royal Navy's improved Type 12 general purpose frigate and technical and training support for construction of 6 vessels. The project to build Nilgiri was led by Homi Sethna and Commander (later Rear Admiral) Prakash N Gour.

The ship was fitted with the Agouti system to minimize propeller cavitation noise.

Decommissioning
INS Nilgiri was decommissioned in 1996. She was sunk on 24 April 1997, in a test firing of a Sea Eagle anti-ship missile by a Sea Harrier Frs Mk.51 taking off from the aircraft carrier .

References

Nilgiri-class frigates
Frigates of the Indian Navy
1968 ships
Frigates of the Cold War